Trombiculini is a tribe of chiggers belonging to the family Trombiculidae.

Genera 
The following genera are currently accepted within Trombiculini:

 Afrotrombicula Kolebinova and Vercammen-Grandjean, 1978
 Alexfainia Yunker and Jones, 1961
 Ancoracarus Takahashi, Misumi and Takahashi, 2012
 Anomalaspis Brennan, 1952
 Aplodontophila Wrenn and Maser, 1981
 Atelepalme Brennan and Reed, 1973
 Audytrombicula Vercammen-Grandjean, 1963
 Babiangia Southcott, 1954
 Batmanacarus Bassini-Silva, Jacinavicius and Ochoa in Bassini-Silva et al., 2021
 Beamerella Brennan, 1958
 Blanciella Vercammen-Grandjean, 1960
 Blankaartia Oudemans, 1911
 Blix Brennan and Yunker, 1966
 Boshkerria Fauran, 1959
 Bramkeria Bassini-Silva, Jacinavicius and Ochoa in Bassini-Silva et al., 2021
 Brennanacarus Goff, Yunker and Wheeler, 1987
 Brygoovia Stekolnikov and Fain, 2004
 Buclypeus Brennan, 1972
 Caamembecaia Gazêta, Amorim, Bossi, Linhares and Serra-Freire, 2006
 Carebareia Goff and Brennan, 1977
 Chiroptella Vercammen-Grandjean, 1960
 Crotiscus Ewing, 1944
 Crotonasis Brennan and Yunker, 1966
 Cubanothrombidium Feider, 1983
 Dolichotrombicula Feider, 1977
 Dongyangsha Wen, 1984
 Ericotrombidium Vercammen-Grandjean, 1965
 Eusaperium Brennan, 1970
 Euschoengastoides Loomis, 1954
 Eutrombicula Ewing, 1938
 Fereus Brennan and Jones, 1961
 Fonsecia Radford, 1942
 Fonsecula Loomis, 1966
 Grandjeana Kocak and Kemal, 2009
 Heaslipia Ewing, 1944
 Heterotectum Feider, 1983
 Hexidionis Vercammen-Grandjean and Loomis, 1967
 Hirsutiella Schluger and Vysotzkaja, 1970
 Hoffmannina Brennan and Jones, 1959
 Hooperella Vercammen-Grandjean, 1967
 Huabangsha Wen, Yu and Yang, 1980
 Hyponeocula Vercammen-Grandjean, 1960
 Hypotrombidium Vercammen-Grandjean, 1966
 Iguanacarus Vercammen-Grandjean, 1965
 Intercutestrix Brennan and Yunker, 1966
 Ipotrombicula Womersley, 1952
 Kaaia Brennan, 1958
 Kepkatrombicula Kudryashova and Stekolnikov, 2010
 Lacertacarus Schluger and Vasilieva, 1977
 Laotrombicula Stekolnikov, 2014
 Leptotrombidium Nagayo, Miyagawa, Mitamura and Imamura, 1916
 Lorillatum Nadchatram, 1963
 Marcandrea Vercammen-Grandjean, 1960
 Microtrombicula Ewing, 1950
 Miyatrombicula Sasa, Kawashima and Egashira, 1952
 Multigniella Vercammen-Grandjean and Fain, 1957
 Muritrombicula Yu, Gong and Tao, 1981
 Myotrombicula Womersley and Heaslip, 1943
 Myxacarus Brennan and Yunker, 1966
 Nahuacarus Bassini-Silva, Jacinavicius and Welbourn in Bassini-Silva et al., 2020
 Neotrombicula Hirst, 1925
 Neotrombiculoides Vercammen-Grandjean, 1960
 Novotrombicula Womersley and Kohls, 1947
 Nycteranistes Brennan and Reed, 1973
 Oaxacarus Goff and Spicer, 1980
 Octasternala Brown, 1990
 Otorhinophila Wrenn and Loomis, 1967
 Oudemansidium Vercammen-Grandjean, 1967
 Parasecia Loomis, 1966
 Paratrombicula Goff and Whitaker, 1984
 Peltoculus Brennan, 1972
 Pentagonaspis Vercammen-Grandjean and André, 1966
 Pentagonotectum Feider, 1983
 Pentidionis Vercammen-Grandjean and Loomis, 1967
 Perates Brennan and Dalmat, 1960
 Perissopalla Brennan and White, 1960
 Phalcophila Brennan and Reed, 1973
 Poliremotus Brennan and Goff, 1978
 Polylopadium Brennan and Jones, 1961
 Pseudoblankaartia Fuller and Wharton, 1951
 Rhinibius Brennan and Yunker, 1969
 Rudnicula Vercammen-Grandjean, 1964
 Sambonacarus Stekolnikov, 2021
 Sasatrombicula Vercammen-Grandjean, 1960
 Sauriscus Lawrence, 1949
 Speleocola Lipovsky, 1952
 Speotrombicula Ewing, 1946
 Striatiscuta Y. Hsu and Y. C. Hsu, 1982
 Tanautarsala Brown, 2007
 Tauffliebiella Vercammen-Grandjean, 1960
 Tecomatlana Hoffmann, 1947
 Tectumpilosum Feider, 1983
 Tenotrombicula Vercammen-Grandjean, 1965
 Teratothrix Brennan and Goff, 1978
 Toritrombicula Sasa, Hayashi and Kawashima, 1953
 Trombicula Berlese, 1905
 Trombiculindus Radford, 1948
 Vanidicus Brennan and Jones, 1961
 Vatacarus Southcott, 1957
 Vercammenia Audy and Domrow, 1957
 Vergrandia Yunker and Jones, 1961
 Whartonacarus Vercammen-Grandjean, 1960
 Willmannium Vercammen-Grandjean and Langston, 1976
 Xinjiangsha Wen and Shao, 1984
 Zumptrombicula Vercammen-Grandjean, 1967

References

Trombiculidae
Arthropod tribes